San Francisco Ballet dances each year at the  War Memorial Opera House, San Francisco, and tours; this is the list of ballets with casts for the 2015 season beginning with the gala, Thursday, January 22, 2015,  The Nutcracker is danced the year before.

Gala

Thursday, January 22, 2015

notes for gala 
The program for the gala 
 Défilé, by Helgi Tomasson
 Alles Walzer (excerpt)
 Act II pas de deux from A Cinderella Story
 Pas de deux from On A Theme of Paganini
 Pas de deux from There Where She Loved©
 Concerto Grosso
 Souvenir D'Un Lieu Cher, an Alexei Ratmansky US premiere
 The American premiere of Souvenir D'Un Lieu Cher is a gift from Alexei Ratmansky in honor of Helgi Tomasson's 30th Anniversary as Artistic Director of San Francisco Ballet 
 Pas de deux from Bells
 The Vertiginous Thrill of Exactitude
 Borealis©, a Christopher Wheeldon world premiere
 Borealis© is a gift from Christopher Wheeldon in honor of Helgi Tomasson's 30th Anniversary as Artistic Director of San Francisco Ballet 
 Act III pas de deux from Onegin
 Le Corsaire Pas de Deux

Program one, Jan 27 - Feb 7 Mixed program 
 Serenade
 RAkU
 Lambarena

Program two, Jan 29 - Feb 10 Full-Length 
 Giselle

Program three, Feb 24 - Mar 7 Mixed program 
 The Vertiginous Thrill of Exactitude
 Variations for Two Couples
 Manifesto, a Myles Thatcher world premiere
 The Kingdom of the Shades from La Bayadère, Act II

Program four, Feb 26 - Mar 8 Mixed program 
 Dances at a Gathering
 Hummingbird, by Liam Scarlett

Program five, Mar 20 - Mar 29 Full-Length 
 Don Quixote

Program six, Apr 8 - Apr 19 Full length 
 Shostakovich Trilogy by Alexei Ratmansky

Program seven, Apr 10 - Apr 21 Mixed Program 
 Caprice by Helgi Tomasson
 Swimmer, a world premiere by Yuri Possokhov
 The Four Temperaments

Program eight, May 1 - May 10 Full length 
 Romeo + Juliet

External links 
 

San Francisco Ballet
Lists of ballets by company
Ballet
2015 in San Francisco